Christoph Rabitsch (born 10 April 1996) is an Austrian footballer who plays for FC Lendorf. He previously played for SV Spittal and Wolfsberger AC in Austria and Dundee United in Scotland.

References

Austrian footballers
Austrian expatriate footballers
1996 births
Living people
Austrian Football Bundesliga players
Austrian Regionalliga players
Scottish Professional Football League players
Wolfsberger AC players
SV Spittal players
Dundee United F.C. players
Association football midfielders
Austrian expatriate sportspeople in Scotland
Expatriate footballers in Scotland
People from Spittal an der Drau
Footballers from Carinthia (state)